Church of San Cristóbal is a church in the city of Puebla's historic centre, in the Mexican state of Puebla.

External links
 

Historic centre of Puebla
Roman Catholic churches in Puebla (city)